Saccharomyces telluris is a species of yeast also known as Kazachstania telluris.  Strains of the species have been isolated from microbiota colonizing birds, though the serotype of a particular strain may differ by species.

References

External links 
 ZipCodeZoo
 MycoBank

telluris